The FIA World Endurance Championship is an auto racing world championship organized by the Automobile Club de l'Ouest (ACO) and sanctioned by the Fédération Internationale de l'Automobile (FIA). The series supersedes the ACO's former Intercontinental Le Mans Cup which began in 2010 and is the first endurance series of world championship status since the demise of the World Sportscar Championship at the end of 1992. The World Endurance Championship name was previously used by the FIA from 1981 to 1985.

The series features multiple classes of cars competing in endurance races, with sports prototypes competing in the Hypercar (LMH) and LMP2 categories, and production-based grand tourers competing in the LM GTE Pro and Am categories. World champion titles are awarded to the top-scoring drivers and manufacturers over the season, while other cups and trophies will be awarded for drivers and private teams.

History
The World Endurance Championship was first run in 2012 as a replacement for the Intercontinental Le Mans Cup, following much of the same format and featuring eight endurance races across the world, including the 24 Hours of Le Mans. There were four categories: LMP1 and LMP2 prototypes along with GTE grand tourers, divided into GTE Pro for teams with professional driver line-ups, and GTE Am for teams featuring a mixture of amateur drivers.

Faced with declining manufacturer interest in the LMP1 class after the 2017 season, the FIA commissioned a study into the future regulations of the championship's top category. Known as the Le Mans Hypercar (LMH), the proposal called for a move away from Le Mans Prototype entries and less reliance on hybrid technologies. The proposal was designed to make the championship more appealing to car manufacturers, and cited flagship models such as the Aston Martin Vulcan and McLaren Senna GTR as examples of the cars the new regulations were hoping to attract. The Hypercar class first appeared in the 2021 season, with LMH entries from Alpine, Glickenhaus and Toyota. From 2023, LMDh entries will also be able to compete full-time in the Hypercar class alongside LMH.

In 2021, the ACO announced that the series would move away from its two LMGTE categories, following a rapid decline in manufacturer interest. The 2022 season will be the last for the LMGTE Pro class, and from 2024, LMGTE Am will be replaced by a GT3-based category, described as a "GT3 Premium" featuring a cost-capped body kit conversion from standard GT3 machinery. According to the president of the FIA Endurance Commission Richard Mille, the FIA are aiming at a customer-focused category where the manufacturers cannot enter officially.

Format
Ten titles are awarded each season based on total point tally, with four being deemed world championships: Hypercar World Endurance Drivers' Championship, GT World Endurance Drivers' Championship, Hypercar World Endurance (Manufacturers') Championship and GT World Endurance Manufacturer's Championship. The points system is similar to that used in the FIA's other world championships, awarding points to the top ten finishers on a sliding point margin scale from first to tenth. Cars finishing the race but classified eleventh or further are awarded a half point. For 8 and 10-hour races, points are worth roughly 1.5x as much (i.e. 25 points for a win is worth 38 points at these races). For the 24 Hours of Le Mans, points are worth roughly 2x as much.

Races

Current races (2023)

Future races (2024 and onwards)

Former races

Champions

See also 
 IMSA SportsCar Championship
 European Le Mans Series
 Asian Le Mans Series

References

External links

 FIA World Endurance Championship 
 Automobile Club de l'Ouest
 Fédération Internationale de l'Automobile

 
Endurance motor racing
World Endurance Championship
Recurring sporting events established in 2012
Sports car racing series
World auto racing series